The Andriyashev largeheaded sculpin (Andriashevicottus megacephalus) is a species of marine ray-finned fish belonging to the family Cottidae, the typical sculpins. This species is found in the northwestern Pacific Ocean. This monospecific genus, and therefore this species, are known from a single specimen, the holotype. FishBase classifies this taxon within the Cottidae but other authorities classify it within the subfamily Psychrolutinae of the family Psychrolutidae. The genus name Andriashevicottus includes a patronym, the person honoured was not identified by the describer Fedorov, however, it is almost certainly the Soviet ichthyologist Anatoly Petrovich Andriashev, the patronym is suffixed with Cottus, the type genus of the family Cottidae. The specific name megacephalus'' means "big head".

References

Cottinae
Monotypic fish genera